Andrea Clearfield (born 1960) is an American composer of contemporary classical music. Regularly commissioned and performed by ensembles in the United States and abroad, her works include music for orchestra, chorus, soloists, chamber ensembles, dance, opera, film, and multimedia collaborations.

Biography 
Clearfield was born on August 29, 1960, in Philadelphia, PA, and grew up in Bala-Cynwyd, a suburb of Philadelphia. She was raised in an artistic family and began studying music at a young age, playing piano, flute and timpani and developing an interest in a broad range of genres. She began exploring composition early on, arranging pop songs from the radio for voices, strings and percussion.

Clearfield met her mentor, composer Margaret Garwood, who was teaching at Muhlenberg College during the time Clearfield was a student there. She later went on to earn a M.M. in Piano from the Philadelphia College of Performing Arts (now the University of the Arts), and subsequently received a D.M.A. in composition from Temple University, where her principal teacher was Maurice Wright. She served on the composition and interdisciplinary arts faculty at The University of the Arts from 1986 to 2011.

Since 1986, Clearfield has been the founder and host of the Salon concert series in Philadelphia, featuring contemporary, classical, jazz, world, folk, rock, and electronic music alongside dance, spoken word, and multimedia art forms. She curates these events, which have become a meeting place for musicians of diverse styles, in Philadelphia and around the US.

Compositional style
Clearfield writes in a wide range of genres encompassing opera, orchestral, choral, chamber, dance, and multimedia, including a number of large-scale cantatas. Her style is lyrical and rhythmically compelling, with lush harmonies and contrasting fields of texture and sound color. Clearfield's music has its roots in a variety of cultural and artistic backgrounds. One of her major cantatas, Women of Valor, based on the women of the Bible, incorporates the poetry of contemporary women writers, while another, The Golem Psalms, takes its inspiration from the legend of the Golem of Prague. Much of Clearfield's work is influenced by ancient Tibetan music, folklore, and culture, including her opera MILA, Great Sorcerer. In her 2012 cantata, Tse Go La (At the threshold of this life), she included Tibetan melodies gathered during her travels to northern Nepal, which she undertook to record and preserve the region's indigenous music.

Awards and Fellowships 
Clearfield has been the recipient of many awards, fellowships, and residencies throughout her career, including the NEA, ASCAP, Leeway Foundation, American Music Center, American Composers Forum, Pennsylvania Council on the Arts, Meet the Composer, and the International Alliance for Women in Music. She has also received a 2016 Pew Fellowship in the Arts and a 2020 Pew International Residency Award, two Independence Foundation Fellowships, and residencies at The Rockefeller Foundation's Bellagio Center, American Academy in Rome, Yaddo, The MacDowell Colony, Virginia Center for the Creative Arts, Brush Creek Foundation for the Arts, Ucross, The Helene Wurlitzer Foundation of New Mexico, Copland House, the Civitella Ranieri Foundation, and the Lucas Artist Residency at Montalvo Arts Center.

Clearfield has held composer-in-residence positions at multiple universities and conservatories, including the Yale-National University of Singapore, the Curtis Institute of Music, Emory University, Michigan State University, the University of Arkansas, The College of New Jersey, Hope College, Penn State University, Dartmouth College, University of Chicago, Indiana University, The College of William and Mary, the University of Texas at Austin, Luther College, The Hartt School of Music, and the Rimsky-Korsakov Conservatory St. Petersburg, Russia among others. She was the featured composer at the 2014 Women Composers Festival of Hartford.

Selected works 
Clearfield's prolific output for vocal, orchestral, chamber, and other genres is published by Boosey & Hawkes, See-A-Dot, G. Schirmer, Jomar Press and International Opus. Her works have been recorded by MSR Classics, Crystal Records, Innova, 2L Norwegian, Albany, and Centaur labels.

Select Discography 
 Three Tributes; work included: Romanza for Violin and Chamber Orchestra. innova Recording. 2021
La Loba; work included: Songs of the Wolf. Summit Records [767]. 2020.
The Diaries of Adam and Eve; work included: A Dream of Trees for violin and double bass. Albany Records [TROY1791]. 2019.
Ecstatic Songs; work included: The Kiss for treble choir, cello and piano. Blue Griffin Records [BGR467]. 2018.
American Canvas; work included: Spirit Island. innova Recording. 2018.
It's About Time; work included: River Melos. Blue Griffin Records. 2017.
 Convergence; work included: Convergence. Bridge Records [BRIDGE 9442]. 2015.
 SO*LOW; work included: River Melos. Bridge Records [BRIDGE 9445]. 2014.
 Metamorphosis; work included: The Golem Psalms. innova Recording. 2012.
It Takes Two...; work included: Three Songs for Oboe and Bass after poems by Neruda. Centaur Records [CRC 2942]. 2008.
The Light Wraps You: New Music for Oboe; work included: Three Songs for Oboe and Bass after poems by Neruda. MSR Classics [MS1217]. 2007.
CEROS; work included: Into the Falcon’s Eye. 2L [2L-025-CD]. 2005.
 The Poetic Oboe; work included: Unremembered Wings. Crystal Records [CD272]. 2004.
 
 Songs of the Wolf; work included: Songs of the Wolf. Crystal Records [CD678]. 1996.
 Into the falcon’s eye Ceros

Opera 
 MILA, Great Sorcerer (2018) with libretto by Jean-Claude van Itallie and Lois Walden, commissioned by Gene Kaufman and Terry Eder. Premiered at PROTOTYPE in NYC Jan. 12, 13, 2019.

Orchestra/Large Ensemble 
 GLOW (2019) for electric guitar and chamber orchestra, commissioned by the Chamber Orchestra of Philadelphia, Maestro Dirk Brossé, music director, Jordan Dodson, soloist.
 Premiered March 31 and April 1, 2019, Kimmel Center, Philadelphia, PA
 Romanza (2007) for Violin and Orchestra or Violin and Chamber Orchestra
Commissioned by Orchestra 2001
 Concertino for Marimba and String Orchestra (2004) Commissioned by the Philadelphia Classical Symphony

Choral (Orchestra/Large Ensemble) 

 Pan with Us from Fire and Ice Cantata (arr. 2022) for SATB Chorus and Orchestra, arrangement commissioned by the University of New Mexico Choirs & Symphony Orchestra
 Premiered May 5, 2022, Popejoy Hall, Albuquerque, NM
 Singing into Presence (2022) for SATB Chorus and Orchestra, commissioned by the University of New Mexico Choirs & Symphony Orchestra 
 Premiered May 5, 2022, Popejoy Hall, Albuquerque, NM
 Tse Go La – At the threshold of this life (2012) for double chorus (SATB and SSA), chamber orchestra and electronics. Co-commissioned by the Mendelssohn Club and the Pennsylvania Girl Choir.
 Les Fenêtres (2011) cantata for soprano and mezzo-soprano soloists, chorus and orchestra to poetry by Rainer Maria Rilke. Commissioned by Singing City, Jeffrey Brillhart, artistic director, for the Philadelphia International Festival of the Arts with the Chamber Orchestra of Philadelphia.
 Kabo Omowale (Welcome Home Child), (2008) choral cantata for SATB chorus (suitable for inter-generational chorus), narrator and orchestra. Commissioned by The Philadelphia Orchestra.
 Fire and Ice (2007) choral cantata for soprano and baritone soloists, SATB chorus and orchestra. Commissioned by The Handel Society of Dartmouth College on the occasion of its bicentennial anniversary.
 The Golem Psalms (2006) choral cantata for baritone soloist, SATB chorus and orchestra (30 minutes). Commissioned by The Mendelssohn Club.
 The Long Bright (2004) soprano solo, treble chorus and orchestra. Commissioned by David Wolman.
 Awake at Dawn (2000) for soprano solo, SATB chorus, strings, harp and percussion. Commissioned by The Music Group of Philadelphia, Sean Deibler, artistic director.

Choral (Chamber/A Cappella) 
 The Song of Hannah (2018) for SATB chorus and organ, commissioned by the Women's Sacred Music Project. Text to 1 Samuel 2:1-9.
 Now Close the Windows for treble choir and piano (2011, arr. 2018), commissioned by Lyric Fest, choral arrangement dedicated to Sandra Snow.
 Khandroma (Sky Dancer - 2017) for SATB chorus with optional percussion, commissioned by the Esoterics, Eric Banks, artistic director, poetry by Sienna Craig.
 Transformed by Fire (2017) for baritone, chorus and piano, composed as part of the Leopold Writing Program, Ariana Kramer, poet.
 That Summer: A Fantasia on Family (2016) for men's chorus, piano and 2 percussion. Commissioned by the Philadelphia Gay Men's Chorus to libretto by Tom Gualtieri.
 Alleluia (2016) for SATB chorus, commissioned by the Mendelssohn Club in honor of Alan Harler.
 The Kiss (2013) for women's chorus, cello and piano commissioned by the Grand Rapids Women's Chorus. 
 When I am Woman (2013) for treble choir and piano, commissioned by the Pennsylvania Girlchoir for their 10 Year Anniversary to poetry by Sonia Sanchez. 
 Shar Ki Ri (Mountain in the East) from Tse Go La cantata (2012) for treble chorus and piano, or piano and percussion. Co-commissioned by the Mendelssohn Club and the Pennsylvania Girl Choir.
 * Poet of the Body and the Soul (2012) for SATB chorus and piano, for The College of New Jersey Chorale to poetry from “Song of Myself” by Walt Whitman, John Leonard, artistic director, premiere March 17, 2012.
 Three Tenses of Light (2012) for SATB chorus and string quartet. Commissioned by The Newburyport Chamber Music Festival, Rhina P. Espaillat, poet, David Yang, artistic director, premiere August, 2012
 Our Better Angels (2009) for men’s chorus (TTBB), brass, harp, percussion and organ. Commissioned by the Turtle Creek Chorale.
 Into The Blue (2008) for SATB chorus, flute, vibraphone and piano, also available for SATB, flute, piano and SATB and piano. Commissioned by The Rainbow Chorale of Delaware.
 Dream Variations (2007) for SATB chorus, flute, viola, harp and organ. Commissioned by The Debussy Trio.
 The Shape of My Soul (2005) SSAA chorus and string quartet (or piano)
Commissioned by the Anna Crusis Women’s Choir in celebration of their 30 Year Anniversary
 The River of God (2003) for SATB chorus and organ. Commissioned by the American Guild of Organists.
 Jocheved (2000, arr. 2001) SSA chorus, flute, percussion, piano. Commissioned by The Women’s Sacred Music Project and The Lady Chapel Singers.
 On the Pulse of Morning (1994-5) SATB Chorus, soloists, orchestra.
 Nes Gadol Hayah Sham (1992) SATB chorus, sop solo, vlc, no.

 Vocal (Orchestra/Large Ensemble) 
 Rabsong Shar – The Eastern Room of the Palace (2016) commissioned by University of Arkansas New Music Ensemble for soprano and chamber orchestra.
 The Rim of Love (2005) for soprano, harp, percussion and string orchestra. Commissioned by Astral. Also available for soprano and piano.
 Women of Valor (2000) soprano, mezzo soprano soloists, narrator, orchestra.
 Miriam's Dance from Women of Valor (2000) for sop. and mz. solos, harp, piano, strings, narrator.
 Hannah's Prayer from Women of Valor (2000) for sop. solo, harp, strings, narrator.

 Vocal (Chamber) 
 Tse Go La Chamber Suite (2016) for vocal soloist, flute, piano, percussion and string quintet commissioned by the Taos Chamber Music Group, Nancy Laupheimer, Artistic Director.
 This Arc Toward Justice (2013) for soprano, alto saxophone and piano to poetry by Angelique Nixon. Commissioned by Susquehanna University. Hagar (2011) for soprano and mezzo soloists, violin, percussion, piano and narrator, to new text by Ellen Frankel. Commissioned by The Women's Sacred Music Project, Premiered at Daylesford Abbey and Germantown Jewish Center, 2011.
 Women of Valor Suite (2011) for soprano and mezzo soloists, violin, percussion, piano and narrator, to 11 texts by contemporary women poets. Arranged from Clearfield's hour-long cantata, Women of Valor.
 A reminiscence sing (2009) for soprano, oboe and string quintet or for soprano (or tenor) clarinet and piano, soprano (or tenor) and piano. Dedicated to Maestro James Freeman in celebration of his 70th birthday.
 L is for Laughter (2005) for soprano, flute (or oboe), cello and piano, or soprano and piano. Commissioned by Jane Foster.
 always (light) - fragments (love) (2000) soprano, flute, cello, piano. Commissioned by Network for New Music.
 Women of Valor Chamber Version (2000, arr. 2009) sop. 1 or 2 mezzo sop., narr., vln., perc., pno.

 Vocal (Voice and Piano) 
 You Bring Out the Doctor in Me (2013) for tenor and piano, commissioned for the AIDS Quilt Songbook.
 The Drift of Things; Winter Songs (2012), 9 movement song cycle for mezzo-soprano, baritone and piano, commissioned by Lyric Fest for their 10-year anniversary.
 Amok” from The Golem Psalms (2006, rev. 2011) for baritone and piano. Commissioned by The Mendelssohn Club, Alan Harler, artistic director.
 Farlorn Alemen (2008) song cycle for soprano and piano. Upcoming arrangement for SATB chorus and piano. Song cycle commissioned by Raya Gonen. Choral arrangement commissioned by Nashirah: The Jewish Chorale of Greater Philadelphia.

 Chamber/Solo Instrumental 
 Ha-Galgal (The Wheel – 2019) for horn solo, commissioned by Julie Landsman.
 Earth Door/Sky Door (2018) for flute, piano, percussion, & string quartet, for Music from Angelfire 2018 Festival, Ida Kavafian, artistic director.
 a space between (2018) for marimba/spoken word and string quartet commissioned by Global Premiere Commissioning Project. Premiered by Lee Hinkle and 21st Century Consort. 
 Tides of Breath (2018) for low flute choir commissioned by Sue Blessing Foundation for the International Low Flute Festival (2018). 
 Round for Three Muses (2017) for percussion solo, percussion ensemble and electronics commissioned by Yun Ju Pan and the MSU Percussion Ensemble.
 Widening Circles (2018) for solo piano. Commissioned by Network for New Music in honor of Linda Reichert's 34-year tenure as artistic director.
 Hvati (2016) for tuba and piano, commissioned for Oystein Baadsvik by Froydis Ree Wekre.
 A Dream of Trees (2016) for violin and bass commissioned by Martha Walvoord and Jack Unzicker.
 love is a place (2016) for flute and piano commissioned by Toby Rotman, Lisa Giannone and Lucille Seeley.
 River Melos (2016) arranged for trombone and piano for Ava Ordman.
 Compass Kaleidoscope (2015) 5-movement woodwind quintet commissioned by The Pennsylvania Quintet in celebration of their 30 Year Anniversary.
 Losing Everyone (2015) for alto flute and guitar. For Duo Sequenza.
 River Melos (2014) for horn and piano commissioned by Denise Tryon (4th Horn, The Philadelphia Orchestra). Published by Brass Arts Unlimited.
 AfterBach (2014) for two flutes for Mimi Stillman and the 10 Year Anniversary of her Dolce Suono Ensemble. Premiered with Mimi Stillman and Jeffrey Khaner, Philadelphia Orchestra Principal Flute, 1/18/2015 in Philadelphia.
 Daughter of the Sea (2014) for Oboe Duo Agosto: Ling-Fei Kang and Charles Huang, commissioned by the Women Composers Festival of Hartford.
 Sagitta (2014) for flute and guitar commissioned by the Diller-Quaile School of Music.
 Romanza (2013) for alto saxophone and piano, arrangement commissioned by Joseph Abad.
 …and low to the lake falls home (A Memoriam for Margaret and Joseph Wincenc),(2010) for Carol Wincenc and Trio “Les Amies”, Carol Wincenc, flute, Cynthia Phelps, viola, Nancy Allen, harp. Also available for flute and piano. Commissioned by Carol Wincenc.
 Unimagined Bridges (2010) for Native American and transverse flutes. Commissioned by Lisamarie McGrath.
 Kawa Ma Gyur (2010) for oboe, bassoon, percussion, vln, vla, vlc, electronics. Inspired by indigenous Tibetan music that Clearfield documented in Lo Monthang, Nepal. Commissioned by Network for New Music, Linda Reichert, artistic director.
 Cal-3 (2009) piano solo, for choreographer/dancer Debby Kajiyama with José Navarrete and painter Heiner Riepl.
 Scherzo after a theme by Diabelli (2009) piccolo, cello and piano, for Network for New Music (celebrating their 25th Anniversary).
 Lung-Ta (2009) for fl, ob, cl, bsn, perc., vln, vla, vlc, digital recordings. Commissioned by Network for New Music.
 Rhapsodie for flute, harp and string trio (2008). Commissioned by William A. Loeb for Mimi Stillman and the Dolce Suono Ensemble.
 Convergence (2008) for viola and piano. Commissioned by Barbara Westphal.
 Sonic Circuits (2007)  for cello and film (with interactive technology). Commissioned by Chamber Music Now.
 River Melos (2004) for tuba and piano.
 Into the Falcon’s Eye (2003) 2 horns and piano, also arranged for clarinet, horn and piano; clarinet, cello and piano; 2 celli and piano. Commissioned by Froydis Ree Wekre. 
 Women of Cyprus (2002) string quintet.
 Re—Turn (2001) violin, piano, bass, drum set and synthesizer. Commissioned by Group Motion Dance Company.
 Unremembered Wings (2001) oboe (or soprano sax) and piano. Commissioned by Andrea Gullickson.
 TRAX Octet (2001) fl, ob, cl (sax), bsn, vla, bass, mba, pno, for Relâche
 Trax (2000) marimba quartet for Battery 4 Percussion Group.
 Double Play (1999) piano, percussion. Commissioned by the Hoffmann/Goldstein Duo.
 Millennium Fanfare (1999) 2 horns, 4 trpts, 3 trbns. Commissioned by Concerto Soloists of Philadelphia.
 Angelfire (1998) fl, vla, ob, cl, bsn, bass, perc, pno, for the Relâche Ensemble.
 Cascade (1998) tenor sax and piano.
 Three Songs for Violin and Double Bass after poems by Pablo Neruda (1998)
 Three Songs for Oboe and Double Bass after poems by Pablo Neruda (1997). Also available for Bassoon and Bass.
 Reminiscence (1997) English Horn and piano (also for English Horn and string quartet or string orchestra). Commissioned by George Corbett. 
 Sax Trax (1997) saxophone quartet.
 Fantasy for Sax Quartet (1997) saxophone quartet.
 Spirit Island (1996) flute, cello, piano. Also available for flute, double bass and piano.
 Songs of the Wolf (1994) horn and piano. Commissioned by Froydis Ree Wekre.

 Collaborative/Multimedia 
 Just as Mist on a Mirror Fades (2013) electronic score for visual artist Martha Boyden in collaboration with dhrupad vocalist Amelia Cuni.
 Califia and the Trespassers (2013) electroacoustic score for installation performance work with Quintan Ana Wikso, filmmaker/poet and Manfred Fischbeck, choreographer. Winner of IAWM Award for Electro-acoustic works.
 Chinnamasta (2011), electronic score. Commissioned and premiered by Group Motion Dance Company, Mandell Theater, Philadelphia.
 Schwarzer Tod (2011), electronic score. Commissioned by Group Motion Dance Company in collaboration with visual artist Quintan Ana Wikswo, premiere November, 2011, Community Education Center, Philadelphia, NYC premiere, Jewish Museum, 1/12.
 Remembrance (2010) electronic score. Commissioned by Group Motion Dance Company, Manfred Fischbeck, artistic director.
 Where there lies dreaming (2010) for electronic score. Commissioned by the Historical Society of Pennsylvania in celebration of the life and work of Mary Hallock Greenewalt.

References

 External links 
 Official site
 Tse Go La'' (video)
 Andrea Clearfield's Salon Celebrates 25 Years in Philadelphia (video)
 Andrea's Catalog at Boosey & Hawkes
 Andrea's Catalog at See-A-Ddot
 Andrea's Catalog at G. Schirmer
 Andrea's Catalog at Jomar Press
 Andrea's Catalog at International Opus
 Andrea's Catalog at MSR Classics
 Andrea's Catalog at Crystal Records
 Andrea's Catalog at innova

1960 births
Living people
American classical composers
American women classical composers
Musicians from Philadelphia
Muhlenberg College alumni
University of the Arts (Philadelphia) alumni
Temple University alumni
20th-century classical composers
21st-century American composers
21st-century classical composers
20th-century American women musicians
20th-century American composers
21st-century American women musicians
Classical musicians from Pennsylvania
20th-century women composers
21st-century women composers